The 1380s was a decade of the Julian Calendar which began on January 1, 1380, and ended on December 31, 1389.

Significant people

References